Nakhon Phanom Football Club (Thai สโมสรฟุตบอลจังหวัดนครพนม ), is a Thailand semi professional football club based in Nakhon Phanom Province. They currently play in Thailand Division 2 League North Eastern Region.

Timeline
History of events of Nakhon Phanom Football Club

Season by season record

P = Played
W = Games won
D = Games drawn
L = Games lost
F = Goals for
A = Goals against
Pts = Points
Pos = Final position

QR1 = First Qualifying Round
QR2 = Second Qualifying Round
R1 = Round 1
R2 = Round 2
R3 = Round 3
R4 = Round 4

R5 = Round 5
R6 = Round 6
QF = Quarter-finals
SF = Semi-finals
RU = Runners-up
W = Winners

Players

Current squad
As of May 16, 2009

External links
 Official Website of Nakhon Phanom FC
 Official Facebookpage of Nakhon Phanom FC
 ตน D2 Nakhonphanom Fc

Football clubs in Thailand
Association football clubs established in 2009
Nakhon Phanom province
2009 establishments in Thailand